Jeanelle Mastema (born September 15, 1984) is a Mexican American experimental body and performance artist from Boyle Heights, California. Mastema incorporates ritual into her work through play piercing, hook suspensions, live magick and sacred objects. She performs internationally, solo and in groups, often acting as a medium for group intentions or a symbolic altar for channeling energy. Through performance, Mastema enters into a meditative head space to disconnect from mundane consciousness. Her major influences include: Butoh, Kenneth Anger, Surrealism, Psychedelic Art, the Viena Actionists, Kembra Pfaher, Leonora Carrington and Alejandro Jodorowsky. She also works as the West Coast sales manager for an adult novelty toy store. She also worked at the Pleasure Chest for many years and is featured in a film called, Thank You Come Again, based on working there.

Early life and education 
In 2010, Mastema studied Music Technology at Los Angeles Community College. She was asked to compose a piece of music and put it to video. She decided to make an art film called 'Contatus,' which was inspired by the Viena Actionists. The word 'contatus' is related to the inertial and survival instincts all people have. In the student film Mastema puts three cheek spears in her face.

Mastema's first time solo in stage was in a show called Autumn Lights for the Omega Collective in downtown Los Angeles. The piece was part of a fashion show in which Mastema modeled Ernie Omega's designs. She pulled needles out of her face and dance as they projected her film Contatus on her body.

In the beginning of her career she went to an Aesthetic Meat Front Performance called Escape from America. In the performance people were hanging from hooks and played as human instruments. Mastema was memorized and ended up becoming good friends with the leader of the group Louis Fleischer. They bonded over their admiration of the Vienna Actionist and Mastema did her first suspension with Louis in Berlin, Germany. She became a member of Aesthetic Meat Front shortly after and did her first group performance in Poland.

Performance art

Solo work 
Mastema started her solo project, Virgo Rising on December 26, 2010. Elements implemented in her performance include fire, writing, psychedelic imagery through visual projection, perceived puking, live music, blood ritual, sexual objects, and urination. Common themes in her performances are rejection of religion, sacred femininity, and psychedelia.

Performance Interpretation

In 2018, Mastema performed Flesh Into Gold in Tijuana, Mexico at club called Dragon Rojo. For the show Embrace Chaos suspended Mastema from eight hooks in her stomach. While she was suspended, she cut the cords holding her up and fell on a bed of broken glass. She then pulled the hooks out of her body and created a sigil on paper. She revealed a chalice held up by her pelvic floor muscles and put the piece of paper she painted into the vessel. She lit the piece of paper on fire and put it out with urination. She concluded the performance by suspending again with two hooks in her back and swinging around.

Group work 
Mastema has worked with a number of performance groups including Embrace Chaos Suspensions, Aesthetic Meat Front (AMF), Coven of Ashes, the Church of Coyote, and Constructs of Ritual Evolution (CORE).

Embrace Chaos Suspensions 
Embrace Chaos Suspensions, headed by Matt Brawley, is an artist collective of suspension practitioners that provide public and private hook and rope suspensions. They also facilitate the hook suspensions for many performance art groups. They have collaborated with groups and artists such as Aesthetic Meat Front, Sheree Rose, Martin O' Brien, Virgo Rising, Coven of Ashes, Missy Munster. Embrace Chaos appears on television such shows such as Ink Master, National Geographic, Discovery Channel, and more.

Performance Interpretation

In 2018, Embrace Chaos collaborated with Sheree Rose and suspended Martin O'Brien during a performance called the Ascension. Sheree Rose is a photographer, author, performance artist, dominatrix, and was the spouse of Bob Flanagan. Bob Flanagan was a writer and performance artist living with cystic fibrosis. Sheree Rose incorporated BDSM and sadomasochism into her relationship dynamic with Bob as a tool to manage the chronic pain he experienced from cystic fibrosis. Rose documented her daily interactions with Bob through photography, video, drawings, and personal artifacts such as jewelry and sex toys. Martin O'Brien is Rose's current performance art partner since Flanagan died. O'Brien almost has cystic fibrosis. The gallery show at the Jason Vass Gallery in downtown Los Angeles featured a collection of Sheree's art and history with Flanagan including her book titled The Medicine Book. On the opening night of the gallery Rose did a live performance with Martin O' Brien, Ron Athey, and Embrace Chaos Suspensions. The piece started off with O' Brien crawling across the gallery floor as a woman wearing a latex nun costume guided him on a leash. Other women dressed as nuns showered him in small cut out pieces of paper with images of Bob Flanagan over him as he made his way into a back room behind the gallery. People gathered around on cushions on the floor behind a decorated bath tub. O' Brien is lead into the tub and the audience was asked to write an intention on a piece of paper. People poured blood on O' Brien's head and covered him in the pieces of paper they wrote on while Rose and Athey recited an homage and prayer to Flannagan. When Rose and Athey concluded their speeches Rose embraced O'Brien and cut a stylized letter S into his flesh. O' Brien is then sat down in a chair and was pierced by Jeanelle Mastema and Matt Brawley from Embrace Chaos Suspensions. They pierced live inserting two hooks  in O'Brien's back and one in each forearm. His body resembled a T shape and was symbolic of a crucifixion. O' Brien swung around in the air hanging from hooks for a few minutes. As he descended to the ground he was embraced by Sheree who held him in her arms cradling him like an infant. In this performance Mastema performed as a practitioner rather than a character or symbol.

Aesthetic Meat Front (AMF) 
Aesthetic Meat Front is a performance group based out of Berlin, Germany created by couture fashion designer Louis Fleischauer. Fleischauer is known for AMF Korsets, his avant-garde line of wearable art and his performance art shows. AMF's performances are often public rituals where people are turned into human instruments through piercing, springs, blood and fashion shows with people hanging from hooks wearing leather corsets with wings.

Performance Interpretation

The most noteworthy AMF performance Mastema was a part of was The Nestle Death Curse at the Lethal Amounts gallery in downtown Los Angeles. This performance was a collaboration between Aesthetic Meat Front, the Church of Coyote, and Sheree Rose. In the performance Mastema's forearms were nailed to a cross and she had hooks in her chest. The performer's bodies were the medium

Coven of Ashes 
Coven of Ashes is an all femme ritual performance group based out of Los Angeles, California. The group is founded and directed by ritual performance artist and blood witch Lauren Davis. This ritualistic performance group incorporates themes such as the feral feminine, the occult, body autonomy, death and rebirth. Using their bodies as mediums, they also incorporate channeling, automatic writing, bloodletting and Ankoku Butoh.

One Coven of Ashes performance, Desecrated in Death: The Path of the Unholy, marked the release of Missy Munster's fashion line Let the Devil In. The performance featured dramatic lighting in which performers crawled onto a giant spirit board, fell into a trance state and bled from their foreheads. One blindfolded performer in the middle of the circle hung from two hooks in her back. She paced back and forth around the circle and was lifted into the air as a human pendulum. Later in the performance, Lauren Davis, playing the role of shadow demon, summons the dead. Jeanelle Mastema and Carmen Carrasco, playing the dead, hung from flesh hooks. They spun in a circle like a mobile until finally resting in their coffins. A sermon was given, while Munster was brought out, bound by rope. With the assistance of Lauren, Munster cut through her restraints and proceeded to insert a spear in her face and cut her chest with a scalpel.

The Church of Coyotel 
The Church of Coyotel is a performance group headed by Steven Johnson Leyba. Leyba is a performance artist with indigenous Apache and Jewish roots, and was adorned as a minister of the Church of Satan by Anton LaVey. His work is often controversial and deals with personal political issues. Many of the Church of Coyotel's themes include anti-corporate values, reclaiming of indigenous identity, rejection and rebellion of patriarchal values, intersectional feminist ideologies and more.

Performance Interpretation

On September 15, 2018 Jeanelle Mastema performed at the Museum of Contemporary Art in Tucson, Arizona. Steven Leyba brought Mastema in as a performer and member of the Church of Coyotel. The exhibition their live performance was featured in was called Blessed Be: Mystics, Spirituality and the Occult in Contemporary Art. The performance called INVOKATION OV RECKONING: A Curse on Your Corporate Masters, A Magickal Retrospective.  To begin the performance Mastema knelt on a bed of broken glass. She had pierced needles into her cheeks with peacock feathers on the ends, and she painted a diamond shape on her chin to represent the tongue of the Hindu goddess Kali. Mastema painted sigils on paper and a fellow performer bled on them. Mastema got up from the ground to reveal a chalice hanging from a vaginal weight. Mastema proceeds to burn the designs and urinate on them to extinguish the fire. Leyba recited spoken word preaching a new Avalon of creativity.

Constructs of Ritual Evolution (CORE) 
Constructs of Ritual Evolution is a performance group founded by Steve Joyner. Steve Joyner is on the Association of Professional Peircers Legislative and Regulatory Affairs Chair and Committee and Board of Directors. CORE was a suspension performance group in the early two thousands.

Performance Interpretation

In 2014, CORE performed with Fakir Musafar in Dallas Texas. In the thirty minute performance Jeanelle Mastema suspended in a cross-legged position with two hook in her back and two in each leg. She spun in circles above the stage while other people performed below her. One of the performer's burdened a kavadi in which he had a cage of spears inserted into the mid-section of his body. Fakir inserted hooks into his chest and pulled against them. He then interacted with a performer named Luna who suspended from two hooks in her chest.

Body Art/ Performance Art 
Scholars have written about incorporating pain in performance art. In Performing Bodies in Pain, Marlo Carlson, "propose[s] that pain is unique among sensations, not because it is inexpressible or radically un-shareable, but because it creates an urgent need to communicate things which no one is eager to listen." Carlson makes the point that watching pain brings up emotions for people that are often difficult to confront. Carlson then goes on to say that, "dramatized pain typically serves as a means to get at the consciousness of the person who inhabits the body, thereby also serving as a call to action for the spectator." As the author points out pain performance art is unique, because of its visceral nature has the ability to deeply move people. This and other scholarly works may provide insight to some of Mastema's performance art.

Live performance archive

Filmography

Television

Music videos

Books and publications

Additional reading 

 Aldersey-Williams, Hugh. Anatomies : a cultural history of the human body. . OCLC 881832175
 Ana Finel Honigman (2014) Enabling Art, Third Text, 28:2, 177-189, DOI: 10.1080/09528822.2014.885201
 Brayshaw, Teresa (2013-10-01). "The Twentieth Century Performance Reader" doi:10.4324/9780203125236.
 Burton, Johanna, editor. Bell, Natalie,. Trigger : gender as a tool and a weapon. . OCLC 1011099218
 Catlin, George (1976). O-Kee-pa: a religious ceremony; and other customs of the Mandans. Yale University Press. 
 Di Bella, Maria Pia, editor. Elkins, James, 1955- (2017). Representations of pain in art and visual culture. Routledge. . OCLC 1009067648.
 Diamond, Elin (2017), "Feminism, Assemblage, and Performance: Kara Walker in Neoliberal Times", Performance, Feminism and Affect in Neoliberal Times, Palgrave Macmillan UK, pp. 255–268, 
 Flanagan, Bob (2017). The Book of Medicine. PrimrosePathPress. .
 Granata, Francesca, (2017). Experimental Fashion : Performance Art, Carnival and the Grotesque Body. I.B. Tauris & Co. Ltd. . OCLC 978979920.
 Johnson, Dominic (2013). Pleading in the blood : the art and performances of Ron Athey. Bristol, UK: Intellect. , 9781783200351
 Lattin, Don; Writer, Chronicle Religion (1997-05-08). "Davis Party Performer Says He's Satanic Priest". SFGate. Retrieved 2019-03-11.
 Lea., Vergine, (2007). Body art and performance : the body as language. Skira Editore. . OCLC 231021228.
 Leyba, Steven Johnson (2015). Coyote Satan Amerika: The Unspeakable Art and Performances of Reverend Steven Johnson Leyba. Last Gasp. .
 Leyba, Steven Johnson (2008). The Coyotel Way. Coyotel Press. .
 Logan, Barbara Ellen (2011). "Performing Bodies in Pain: Medieval and Post-Modern Martyrs, Mystics, and Artists (review)". Comparative Drama. 45 (3): 303–306. doi:10.1353/cdr.2011.0016. ISSN 1936-1637
 Metzger, Jane. Sean A Shanks, Gwyneth (2016-01-01). Performing the Museum: Displaying Gender and Archiving Labor, from Performance Art to Theater. eScholarship, University of California. OCLC 1078235377
 Musafar, Fakir (2015). SPIRIT AND FLESH. Arena Editions. .
 Oliver, Sophie Anne. (2010) "Trauma, bodies, and performance art: Towards an embodied ethics of seeing," Continuum, 24:1, 119-129, DOI: 10.1080/10304310903362775
 Paffrath, James (1984). Obsolete Body / Suspensions / Stelarc. JP Publications;. 
 Petra., Kuppers, (2007). The scar of visibility : medical performances and contemporary art. University of Minnesota Press. . OCLC 182857333.
 Phelan, Peggy. (2012). Live art in LA : performance in Southern California, 1970-1983. Routledge. . OCLC 876441952
"Extended-Body: Interview with Stelarc". web.stanford.edu. Retrieved 2019-03-11.
 "Radical Women: Latin American Art, 1960–1985". Panorama.2018. doi:10.24926/24716839.1653. ISSN 2471-6839.
 Regan, Margaret. "Art From the Dark Side". Tucson Weekly. Retrieved 2019-03-11.
 Rothstein, Adam (2015-10-26). "Meet the Artists/Occultists Channeling the Death of Monsanto". Creators. Retrieved 2019-03-11.
 Santana, Analola (2018). Freak performances : dissidence in Latin American theater. Michigan: Ann Arbor : University of Michigan Press.

References

External links 
 Aesthetic Meat Front performance of Escape from Amerika at YouTube
 
 https://m.youtube.com/watch?feature=youtu.be&v=PwJxFSwbF_w

1984 births
Living people
American performance artists
21st-century American artists
21st-century American women artists